See You on the Other Side may refer to:

 See You on the Other Side (Korn album)
 See You on the Other Side (Mercury Rev album)
 "See You on the Other Side", a song by Ozzy Osbourne from his 1995 album Ozzmosis
 "See You on the Other Side", a song by BT from his album This Binary Universe
 "See You on the Other Side", a song by Morgan Cryar from his album Kingdom Upside Down
 Tag line for the film Central Intelligence